Hurricane Kiko was one of the strongest tropical cyclones on record to have made landfall on Mexico's Baja California peninsula. The eleventh named storm of the 1989 Pacific hurricane season, Kiko formed out of a large mesoscale convective system on August 25. Slowly tracking northwestward, the storm rapidly intensified into a hurricane early the next day. The storm turned west at this time, and at around 0600 UTC, the storm made landfall near Punta Arena, Mexico at the southern tip of Baja California Sur. The hurricane rapidly weakened into a tropical storm later that day and further into a tropical depression by August 28, shortly after entering the Pacific Ocean. The depression persisted for another day while tracking southward, before being absorbed by nearby Tropical Storm Lorena. Though Kiko made landfall as a Category 3 hurricane, its impact was relatively minor. Press reports indicated that 20 homes were destroyed and numerous highways were flooded by torrential rains.

Meteorological history

Unlike most other eastern Pacific hurricanes between 1988 and 1990 that began as tropical waves off the western coast of Africa, Hurricane Kiko developed out of a large-scale mesoscale convective system on August 23 on the coast of Sonora. The system slowly tracked southward into the Gulf of California and became increasingly organized. Shower and thunderstorm activity was present around an area of low pressure the following day; however, insufficient reports from the region hindered the National Hurricane Center's (NHC) forecasting ability. Located within an area with little or no steering current, and situated over warm waters and underneath an upper-level low, conditions were near perfect for rapid intensification, despite the proximity to land. A general northwestward drift was anticipated, and the NHC forecast the storm to reach hurricane intensity within 24 hours.

Convective banding features began to develop late on August 25 as winds around the center reached . With the development of an anticyclone over the storm, Kiko's outflow become more pronounced. Around 0600 UTC on August 26, an eye developed within the small circulation, suggesting the cyclone had strengthened into a Category 1 hurricane on the Saffir–Simpson hurricane wind scale. However, satellite intensity estimates indicated winds of only .

A trough located to the north of the hurricane began to weaken, causing the storm to track in a more westward direction. Kiko weakened slightly before making landfall near Punta Arena, on the southern tip of Baja California, with winds of 115 mph (185 kph). Kiko was thus the second major hurricane to ever make landfall on the Gulf Coast of Baja California since reliable recordkeeping began in 1949, with the other being 1967's Hurricane Olivia. Due to the small size and slow movement of the storm, it rapidly weakened, becoming a tropical storm by 1800 UTC. Convection associated with the storm significantly diminished; the center of circulation became nearly devoid of thunderstorm activity early on August 28. Shortly after emerging into the Pacific Ocean, Kiko was further downgraded into a tropical depression, and turned towards the southwest due to interaction with nearby Tropical Storm Lorena. Tropical Depression Kiko dissipated around 1800 UTC on August 29; however, its remnants continued southward before being absorbed by Lorena.

Preparations and impact

Around 2100 UTC on August 25, the Government of Mexico issued a hurricane warning for the Islas Marías and areas between the southern border of Sonora and El Dorado. A hurricane watch was also issued for areas between Los Burros, Mexico and the southern tip of Baja California Sur along the Gulf of California. By 0900 UTC the following day, the hurricane watch was upgraded to a warning. Roughly three hours later, the previous hurricane watch issued for Sonora was discontinued as Kiko was no longer forecast to make landfall in the state. The hurricane warning on Baja California was also extended northward to Bahía Concepción. Due to uncertainty in Kiko's track, a hurricane watch was re-issued for Sonora between El Dorado and Los Mochis. Around 0900 UTC on August 27, a hurricane warning was issued for areas south of San Carlos on the Pacific coast of Baja California. The hurricane watch for Sonora was then discontinued. By 1800 UTC, the hurricane warnings on the Gulf Coast of Baja California were replaced by a tropical storm warning which was declared for areas between the southern tip of the peninsula and Bahía Concepción. At this time, the hurricane warning for the Pacific coast was revised to a tropical storm warning. Early on August 28, all watches and warnings were discontinued as Kiko weakened into a tropical depression and moved away from land.

In Baja California Sur, more than 1,300 people evacuated to shelters in La Paz. Flights arriving and departing in the region were canceled or diverted to other airports. The Red Cross prepared shelters in schools, hospitals, and other public buildings throughout the city. On the Islas Marías, an unconfirmed report of  sustained winds was relayed to the National Hurricane Center. Due to the hurricane's small size, only areas directly in the path of the storm received precipitation; however, a monsoonal outer band on the eastern side of the storm produced widespread rainfall in eastern Mexico. At least 1,000 people were evacuated from heavily damaged areas. Press reports indicated that 20 homes were destroyed by Hurricane Kiko.

Meteorological recordings near the place of landfall were not available as the small system tracked over a sparsely populated region. From La Paz to Cabo San Lucas, power and water supplies were lost. The heavy rains flooded several highways, and the resultant flood waters overturned a bus. Passengers on the bus managed to escape injury and were quickly brought to shelter by the local fire department. The Rancho Leonero Resort in Buena Vista sustained severe roof damage and several docked boats were damaged. Several days after Kiko dissipated, remnant moisture from the storm contributed to a complex weather system that produced torrential rainfall throughout the U.S. state of Kansas, unofficially reaching  in localized areas.

See also

 1989 Pacific hurricane season
 Other tropical cyclones named Kiko

References

External links

 The National Hurricane Center's Preliminary Report on Hurricane Kiko

1989 in Mexico
1989 Pacific hurricane season
Category 3 Pacific hurricanes
Hurricanes and tropical depressions of the Gulf of California
Pacific hurricanes in Mexico